Ahmed Boughèra El Ouafi (15 October 1898 – 18 October 1959) was an Algerian athlete during the time of the French occupation of Algeria. In 1928, he won the Olympic gold medal in the marathon.

Biography

El Ouafi was born in the town of Ouled Djellal, joining the French military regiment later (at that time, Algeria was part of French Algeria). One of his superior officers noticed El Ouafi's outstanding athletic abilities, and decided to send him to a military sports competition in France. He made a good impression there, and was allowed to enter qualification for the 1924 Summer Olympics in Paris in the marathon event.

Boughèra El Ouafi managed to qualify, and completed his first Olympic marathon, running for France, in seventh position. This good result allowed him to prepare more extensively for the next Games, held in Amsterdam. In the 1928 competition, he ran behind the leaders for the first three quarters of the race, overtaking them some 5 km before the end. He was never caught by any of the other runners, and finished first, 26 seconds ahead of second-placed Manuel Plaza from Chile.  El Ouafi was the only representative of French athletics to win gold at the 1928 Olympics.

After his surprise victory, El Ouafi toured the United States. However, the money he earned with this trip disqualified him as an amateur, causing him to leave the sport, and he opened a cafe in Paris. El Ouafi remained forgotten until 1956, when another Algerian, Alain Mimoun, also won the Olympic marathon. Reporters went to seek out the other Algerian who had won 28 years earlier, and found him a pauper.

El Ouafi was killed while in a café, three days after his 61st birthday. Accounts of his death vary. French media then claimed that he was targeted by members of the National Liberation Front after he had refused to support them; other accounts say he was a bystander victim of an argument between family members and revolutionaries, or was killed during a family quarrel.

References

Sources
 Wallechinsky, David (2004).  The Complete Book of the Summer Olympics, Toronto: Sport Classic Books.  

1898 births
1959 deaths
Algerian male marathon runners
Athletes (track and field) at the 1924 Summer Olympics
Athletes (track and field) at the 1928 Summer Olympics
Olympic gold medalists for France
Olympic athletes of France
French sportspeople of Algerian descent
French male long-distance runners
French male marathon runners
People from Biskra Province
Medalists at the 1928 Summer Olympics
Olympic gold medalists in athletics (track and field)
Algerian murder victims
Male murder victims
People murdered in Algeria